Cambalache Bridge or  is a bridge built in 1893 which spans the Río Grande de Arecibo from Cambalache barrio to Tanamá barrio in Arecibo. It is located 100 meters west of Puerto Rico Highway 2, at kilometer 72. 

The train section from San Juan to Arecibo was completed in 1891, but it was not until 1893 that the Cambalache Bridge, spanning the river, was completed. Before the opening of the Cambalache Bridge, the train ended at Cambalache and passengers and cargo had to cross a temporary wooden bridge on horse or by ox cart. The construction of the Cambalache Bridge, also called the French Bridge, was an important connection for train transport between the cities of the north coast and the estates of Arecibo.

The structure of the Cambalache bridge has not undergone significant alterations since its period of greater historical importance and has maintained a degree of integrity in its design, workmanship, materials and setting. The train route is still used for agricultural purposes.

The bridge was listed on the US National Register of Historic Places on July 19, 1995.

See also
 National Register of Historic Places listings in northern Puerto Rico

References

		
National Register of Historic Places in Arecibo, Puerto Rico
Bridges completed in 1893
1893 establishments in Puerto Rico
Road bridges on the National Register of Historic Places in Puerto Rico
Pratt truss bridges